Jose Solis (died April 23, 2013) was a Filipino politician, who was a member of the House of Representatives for Sorsogon's 2nd District (2001–2010).

References

Year of birth missing
2013 deaths
Members of the House of Representatives of the Philippines from Sorsogon
Bicolano politicians
Lakas–CMD (1991) politicians
Kabalikat ng Malayang Pilipino politicians
People from Sorsogon